This is a list of people elected Fellow of the Royal Society in 1933.

Fellows 

Patrick Maynard Stuart Blackett, Baron Blackett of Chelsea
James Bertram Collip
Rookes Evelyn Bell Crompton
Harry Medforth Dawson
Arthur Thomas Doodson
Herbert John Gough
Sir John Hammond
Sir Gordon Morgan Holmes
Harold King
Sir John Edward Lennard-Jones
James Walter McLeod
Sir Alan Sterling Parkes
Sir Edward James Salisbury
Bernard Smith
William Robin Thompson
Arthur Mannering Tyndall
Joseph Wedderburn

Foreign members 
Vilhelm Friman Koren Bjerknes
Harvey Williams Cushing
Peter Joseph Wilhelm Debye
Friedrich August Ferdinand Christian Went

Statue 12 fellows

Sir Richard Arman Gregory

1933
1933 in science
1933 in the United Kingdom